In Greek mythology, Iamenus (Ancient Greek: Ἰαμενός) was a Trojan hero in the Iliad. Together with Asius, he was slain by Leonteus during the attack of the Trojans on the camp of the Greeks.

Note

References 

 Homer, The Iliad with an English Translation by A.T. Murray, Ph.D. in two volumes. Cambridge, MA., Harvard University Press; London, William Heinemann, Ltd. 1924. . Online version at the Perseus Digital Library.
 Homer, Homeri Opera in five volumes. Oxford, Oxford University Press. 1920. . Greek text available at the Perseus Digital Library.

External links

Trojans